A priest is a person who holds an office in a religion, for example an Orthodox Christian priest, Roman Catholic priest, Hindu priest, an Imam in Islam, or a Kohen in Judaism.

Priest may also refer to:

Characters
Reginald J. Priest, President of the United States in the TV series The Lexx
Youngblood Priest, protagonist of the 1972 film Super Fly
Grand Priest, a character from Dragon Ball Super

Films
Priest (1994 film), a British film
Priest (2011 film), an American film loosely based on the Korean comic
The Priest (2009 film), a Russian film
The Priest (2021 film), a Malayalam-language Indian film
The Priests (film), a 2015 South Korean film

Music
The Priests, an Irish vocal trio
The Priests (album), 2008
"The Priest", a song by Limp Bizkit from the 2005 album The Unquestionable Truth (Part 1)
"The Priest", a song by Joni Mitchell from the 1970 album Ladies of the Canyon
Priests (band), a post-punk band from Washington D.C.

People
Alfred Priest (1810–1850), English painter of landscapes
Cathy Priest (born 1971), a Canadian female bodybuilder
Cherie Priest (born 1975), American novelist
Christopher Priest (disambiguation)
Christopher Priest (novelist) (born 1943), English novelist
Christopher Priest (comics) (born 1961), comic book writer
Dana Priest (born 1957), author
Daniel Priest (1814–1883), Australian convict
Daniel B. Priest (1830–1870), American lawyer
Degory Priest (died 1621), passenger on the Mayflower
Eric Priest (born 1943), professor
Fred Priest (1875–1922), professional footballer
Graham Priest (born 1948), philosopher
Ivy Baker Priest (1905–1975), American politician
J.W. Priest (died 1859), American architect
Josias Priest (1645–1735), English dancer
Killah Priest (born 1970), American rapper
Lee Priest (born 1972), Australian male bodybuilder
Langford Wellman Colley-Priest (1890–1928), Australian stretcher bearer during the First World War 
Margaret Priest (born 1944), Canadian artist
Mark Priest (born 1961), New Zealand cricketer
Mathew Priest (born 1970), British drummer
Maxi Priest (born 1961), English Reggae singer
Pat Priest (judge) (1940–2018), Texan judge
Patricia Ann Priest (born 1935), American actress
Percy Priest (1900–1956), American politician
Priest (writer) (born 1988), Chinese novelist
Priest Holmes (born 1973), American football running back
Priest Lauderdale (born 1973), American basketball player
Robert Priest (born 1951), Canadian poet and children's author
Sharon Priest (born 1947), American-Canadian politician
Terri Priest (1928–2014), American artist
Tim Priest (police officer), Australian policeman
Tim Priest (American football) (born 1949), American football broadcaster

Places

Canada
Priest Mine, Ontario

United Kingdom
Priest's Cove, Cornwall
Priest Island, Scotland

United States
The Priest (mountain), Nelson County, Virginia
Priest, California
Priest Lake, Idaho
Priest Point, Washington
Priest Rapids on the Columbia River, Washington state
Priest Rapids Dam
Priest River, Idaho

Tools
 Priest (tool), a tool for killing fish
 PriEsT, a software tool to help making decisions

Other uses
M7 Priest, an informal name for an American World War II self-propelled artillery vehicle
Priest (manhwa), a Korean Weird West comic
Priest (TV series), a 2018 South Korean television series
Priest hole, a hiding place for a priest built into many Catholic houses of England
Priest (World of Warcraft), a class in World of Warcraft and other MMORPGs
The Priest, a magazine for priests published by Our Sunday Visitor
Priest (Latter Day Saints)

See also
Judas Priest, an English heavy metal band formed in 1969
Saint-Priest (disambiguation)